EKC may refer to:

 Eastern Karnic language
 Eastman Kodak Company
 Environmental Kuznets curve
 Epidemic Keratoconjunctivitis, a viral eye infection
 Essendon Keilor College, in Victoria, Australia
 European Kendo Championships
 European Kings Club, a Ponzi scheme